Old Stone Church (also known as the Presbyterian Meeting House) is a historic church at 304 E. Piccadilly Street in Winchester, Virginia.

The church meeting house was constructed in 1788. Upon its completion, local Presbyterians began worshipping in the building. In 1800, the Winchester Presbytery officially established the congregation as the "Presbyterian Church in Winchester." The  first pastor was the Rev. Dr. William Hill.

The church building was added to the National Register of Historic Places in 1977.

References

External links
 
Official website of original congregation

Presbyterian churches in Virginia
Churches completed in 1788
18th-century Presbyterian church buildings in the United States
Churches on the National Register of Historic Places in Virginia
Buildings and structures in Winchester, Virginia
Churches in Frederick County, Virginia
Stone churches in Virginia
National Register of Historic Places in Winchester, Virginia
1788 establishments in Virginia